Z1, Z-1, or Z.1 may refer to:
 Z.1 or the Flow of Funds, a U.S. government fiscal report
 Z.1, an anti-tank barrier known as Admiralty scaffolding
 Z-1 (band), a Japanese idol group
 Z1 class Melbourne tram
 Z-1 (comics), a DC comics character
 Z1 (computer), a mechanical computer designed by Konrad Zuse from 1935 to 1936
 Z1 Battle Royale, a 2018 video game
 Z1 TV, a Czech TV channel
 Z1 Zagrebačka Televizija, a Croatian regional television network 
 Z-1 Suit, an experimental space suit
 AEG Z.1, a German aircraft built before World War I from Zagreb
 BMW Z1, a two-seat roadster
 German destroyer Z1 Leberecht Maass
 Great Northern Railway Z-1 class, a class of electric locomotives used by the Great Northern Railway (U.S.) 
 NER Class Z1, a class of British steam locomotives (redesignated class Z in 1914) 
 Goodyear Z-1, N-class blimps of the U.S. Navy 
 HZ-1 Aerocycle, an experimental U.S. Army flying platform of the 1960s
 Kawasaki Z1, a motorcycle
 Sony HVR-Z1, a HDV format camcorder manufactured by Sony
 Sony Xperia Z1, a smartphone manufactured by Sony
 Zork I, an interactive fiction computer game
 the train code for high-speed train between Shanghai and Beijing
Z1 Digital Studio, an international digital product studio based in Seville